Lirael (called Lirael: Daughter of the Clayr in some regions) is a fantasy novel by Garth Nix, first published in 2001. Named for its central female character, Lirael is the second in his Old Kingdom trilogy, preceded by Sabriel and continued in Abhorsen.

Plot introduction

The book is split into three parts, the first of which is set 14 years after the events in Sabriel; the last two parts are set five years after part one. Sabriel and Touchstone have married since Sabriel and assumed a measure of control over the Old Kingdom. Their children Ellimere and Sameth were going to school in Ancelstierre (similarly to Sabriel) before being expected to take up their duties in the Old Kingdom.

Plot summary
Lirael, the protagonist of the second and third books, is raised as a Clayr, part of a vast family of precognitive women who dwell in a remote glacier within the Old Kingdom.  As she lacks the Clayr's precognitive 'Sight', she considers herself not a true Clayr and prefers solitude to company. In young-adulthood, she joins the staff of the Clayr's Library, and acquires the Disreputable Dog; and with the latter's help, vanquishes a series of monsters in the Library itself.

Five years later, in Ancelstierre, Prince Sameth encounters the necromancer Hedge and his undead minions, which injures Sameth both spiritually and physically. His father Touchstone therefore takes him back to the Old Kingdom and the safety of the palace in Belisaere. Here he is expected to succeed his mother Sabriel as the Abhorsen: a future whereof he is mortally afraid. Under Hedge's influence, Sameth's friend Nicholas Sayre (an Ancelstierran aristocrat) crosses the border into the Old Kingdom and travels to the Red Lake, where the royal rule does not extend and the Clayr cannot See. Sameth flees the palace to rescue Nick, and is later joined by Mogget. Lirael, on her nineteenth birthday, is identified as a 'Remembrancer' (a clairvoyant able to accurately perceive the past), and sent (with the Dog) to the Red Lake to rescue Nick, who has by now become the host of a malign, alien intelligence. En route, Lirael joins Sam and Mogget, and they continue to the Red Lake, but are nearly vanquished by Chlorr of the Mask and her followers, and recover at the Abhorsen's House. There, Lirael is identified as Sabriel's half-sister and heir, and Sameth with the long-extinct 'Wallmakers'.

Characters in "Lirael"
 Lirael - title character, raised as an orphan Clayr, half-sister of Sabriel.
 Disreputable Dog - a Free Magic creature also infused with Charter Magic, she was only supposed to be a puppy sending to comfort Lirael; however, while creating the sending, Lirael touched on some ancient magic in the dog statuette she found in the Clayr library and awoke the Dog
 Prince Sameth - the son of King Touchstone and the Abhorsen Sabriel; enjoys making toys and is one, if not the last, of the Wallmakers who made the Wall which divides the two Kingdoms; he has been into Death and was Abhorsen-in-Waiting before Lirael's ascent into the title and role, but his encounter with Hedge has left him with an almost mortal fear of Death
 Mogget - an ancient Free Magic construct of unknown origin; appears in the form of a white cat and is bound by a red Charter magic collar to serve the Abhorsen
 Nicholas Sayre - a friend of Sameth from Ancelstierre, a sceptic who does not believe in magic and is always looking for a scientific reason for magical phenomena.  
 Ellimere - Sameth's older sister, destined to be Queen
 Sabriel - the current Abhorsen, who destroyed Kerrigor many years before with the King, the former Abhorsen, and Mogget; is also wed to Touchstone and is Queen
 Touchstone - the King, a bastard son of a Queen and a nobleman who was trapped as a wooden figurehead of a funeral ship for 200 or so years before Sabriel saved him
 Hedge - an ancient necromancer serving a greater power; he attempts to capture Prince Sameth but obtains Nicholas Sayre instead
 Chlorr of the Mask - an ancient necromancer who Sabriel defeats early in Lirael, later raised by Hedge to become one of the Greater Dead 
 Sanar and Ryelle - Clayr twins who have the strongest Sight and aid both the Royal family and Lirael

Major themes
The novel is more soul-searching than its predecessor Sabriel, and the major theme is that society does not have to dictate the outcome of one's future. Lirael comes to terms with her lack of the Sight by becoming busy in the Library, going nearer and nearer to her birthright as the Remembrancer, and, eventually, the Abhorsen-in-Waiting. This is also echoed in Sameth's story, as he struggles to accept (or avoid) his role as Abhorsen-in-Waiting.

References

2001 novels
Australian fantasy novels
Australian young adult novels
Old Kingdom series books
Novels by Garth Nix
Fictional undead
2001 fantasy novels
Books with cover art by Leo and Diane Dillon